Wiru or Witu may refer to:
 Wiru people
 Wiru language
 Wiru Rural LLG, Papua New Guinea